Spies is a surname of German origin, and may refer to:

 August Spies (1855–1887), anarchist
 Ben Spies (born 1984), American motorcycle road racer
 Leo Spies (1899–1965), Russian-born German composer and conductor
 Liesbeth Spies (born 1966), Dutch politician
 Moritz Ritter von Spies (1805–1862), Bavarian Major General and War Minister
 Pierre Spies (born 1985), South African rugby player
 Simon Spies (1921–1984), Danish tycoon best known for starting the charter airline Spies Rejser
 Walter Spies (1895-1942), German painter

See also 
 Spies (disambiguation)

German-language surnames